Two ships in the United States Navy have been named USS Gilmer after the 19th-century American statesman Thomas Walker Gilmer:

  was a  commissioned in 1920 and decommissioned in 1946.
  was a patrol boat commissioned in 1942 and decommissioned in 1946.

United States Navy ship names